Dr. Padmasinha Bajirao Patil (born 1 June 1940) is a former member of 15th Lok Sabha, the lower house of Parliament of India. 

His step sister is wife of Deputy-chief minister Ajit Pawar. He was a minister in the Maharashtra Government for more than 20 years. He is former deputy speaker of the Maharashtra Vidhan Sabha, Deputy Opposition Leader and also the State President of Sharad Pawar's Congress(S). 

Patil was elected to the Lok Sabha on a Nationalist Congress Party ticket in the May 2009 general elections. He is a former member of the Maharashtra Legislative Assembly for 8 terms. He was responsible in bringing Chhagan Bhujbal into the Nationalist Congress Party and creating other stalwart leaders in the party. His son Ranajagjitsinha Patil is a former Minister of State for Industries, Revenue, Agriculture, Cultural Affairs, Protocol, Employment and Employment with guarantee scheme, Parliamentary Affairs and a Member of the Legislative Council for two terms; he has now been elected as a Member of the Legislative Assembly for Osmanabad Vidhan Sabha constituency.

Positions held
1975-1978 Chairman Building and Construction ("B&C") Committee Zilla Parishad ("Z.P.") Osmanabad
1975-1978 Member Zilla Parishad Osmanabad
1978-2009 Member of the Maharashtra Legislative Assembly ("MLA")
1978–1980 Cabinet Minister for Energy & Excise, Government of Maharashtra
1986–1988 Deputy Speaker, Maharashtra Legislative Assembly
1988–1994 Cabinet Minister for Irrigation, Home Affairs & Ex. Services Welfare, Government of Maharashtra
1995-1999 Deputy Leader of the Opposition
1999–2002 Cabinet Minister for Energy and Water Resources, Government of Maharashtra
2002–2004 Cabinet Minister for Water Resources (excluding Krishna Valley Irrigation), Government of Maharashtra
2009      Elected to the 15th Lok Sabha.

References

India MPs 2009–2014
Indian prisoners and detainees
People from Osmanabad district
Marathi politicians
Living people
1940 births
Nationalist Congress Party politicians from Maharashtra
Maharashtra MLAs 1978–1980
Maharashtra MLAs 1985–1990
Lok Sabha members from Maharashtra
United Progressive Alliance candidates in the 2014 Indian general election
Deputy Speakers of the Maharashtra Legislative Assembly
People from Marathwada
Maharashtra district councillors
Indian National Congress (U) politicians
Indian Congress (Socialist) politicians